Mount Buckindy is a remote  mountain summit located in the North Cascades, in Skagit County of Washington state. It is the second-highest point of the Buckindy Range, or Buckindy Ridge. It is set in the Glacier Peak Wilderness on land managed by the Mount Baker-Snoqualmie National Forest. It is situated 20 miles east-northeast of Darrington, Washington, and 17 miles north-northwest of Glacier Peak which is one of the Cascade stratovolcanoes. Precipitation runoff from Mount Buckindy drains south to the Suiattle River via Buck Creek and Downey Creek, and north to the Cascade River via Kindy Creek. The mountain's toponym is a portmanteau of Buck and Kindy Creeks, and has been officially adopted by the United States Board on Geographic Names.

Climate

Mount Buckindy is located in the marine west coast climate zone of western North America. Most weather fronts originate in the Pacific Ocean, and travel northeast toward the Cascade Mountains. As fronts approach the North Cascades, they are forced upward by the peaks of the Cascade Range, causing them to drop their moisture in the form of rain or snowfall onto the Cascades (Orographic lift). As a result, the west side of the North Cascades experiences high precipitation, especially during the winter months in the form of snowfall. This climate supports the Kindy and Goat Creek Glaciers as well as glacierets on this mountain's slopes. During winter months, weather is usually cloudy, but due to high pressure systems over the Pacific Ocean that intensify during summer months, there is often little or no cloud cover during the summer.

Geology

The North Cascades features some of the most rugged topography in the Cascade Range with craggy peaks, ridges, and deep glacial valleys. Geological events occurring many years ago created the diverse topography and drastic elevation changes over the Cascade Range leading to the various climate differences. These climate differences lead to vegetation variety defining the ecoregions in this area.

The history of the formation of the Cascade Mountains dates back millions of years ago to the late Eocene Epoch. With the North American Plate overriding the Pacific Plate, episodes of volcanic igneous activity persisted. In addition, small fragments of the oceanic and continental lithosphere called terranes created the North Cascades about 50 million years ago.

During the Pleistocene period dating back over two million years ago, glaciation advancing and retreating repeatedly scoured the landscape leaving deposits of rock debris. The "U"-shaped cross section of the river valleys are a result of recent glaciation. Uplift and faulting in combination with glaciation have been the dominant processes which have created the tall peaks and deep valleys of the North Cascades area. The rusty reddish color of Mount Buckindy and the Buckindy Range is due to mineralized breccia pipe.

See also

Geography of the North Cascades
Geology of the Pacific Northwest

References

External links 

 Weather forecast: Mount Buckindy
 Aerial photos of glaciers on Mt. Buckindy: PBase
 Mt. Buckindy photo: PBase

Mountains of Washington (state)
Mountains of Skagit County, Washington
Cascade Range
North Cascades
North American 2000 m summits
Mount Baker-Snoqualmie National Forest